Galeruca rufa is a species of leaf beetle native to Europe.

It has been observed defoliating Convolvulus arvensis L. (field bindweed). G. rufa appears to feed only on the genera Convolvulus and Calystegia.

Studies were halted on this species when it was determined to reproduce successfully on several North American sweet potato varieties.

References

http://www.ingentaconnect.com/content/esa/envent/1977/00000006/00000001/art00036
http://ucce.ucdavis.edu/files/repositoryfiles/ca3709p18-72316.pdf

Galerucinae
Beetles of Europe
Beetles described in 1824
Taxa named by Ernst Friedrich Germar